The 2012 United States House of Representatives election in Alaska was held on Tuesday, November 6, 2012, to elect the U.S. representative from Alaska's at-large congressional district, who will represent the state of Alaska in the 113th United States Congress. The election coincided with the elections of other federal and state offices, including a quadrennial presidential election. As is the case every twelve years in Alaska, this will be the only statewide election contest held amongst this year's elections. A primary election was held on August 28, 2012.

Primary elections

Republican

 John R. Cox of Anchor Point. Retired Navy officer who previously ran for this seat in 2010.
 Terre Gales of Eagle River. Asset manager, former defense contractor, and Air Force veteran.
 Don Young, incumbent
Primary results

ADL (Alaskan Independence–Democratic–Libertarian)

Democratic
 Debra Chesnut of Fairbanks. Nurse and businesswoman.
 Sharon Cissna, state Representative
 Matt Moore of Anchorage. Businessman and former candidate for the Alaska Legislature.
 Doug Urquidi of Eagle River.  Electrician who ran unsuccessfully in 2011 for an Eagle River-based seat on the Anchorage Assembly.
 Frank J. Vondersaar of Homer. Lawyer, engineer, and perennial candidate who has run for the U.S. House and U.S. Senate from Alaska numerous times. Democratic nominee for U.S. Senate in 2002.

Libertarian
 Jim C. McDermott of Fairbanks. Business professor.
Primary results

General election

Candidates
 Sharon Cissna (D), state representative
 Jim McDermott (L), business professor
 Don Young (R), incumbent U.S. Representative
 Ted Gianoutsos of Anchorage. Perennial candidate who filed by nominating petition to run as an independent (referred to as "Non-Affiliated" by the Alaska Division of Elections).
 Clinton Desjarlais of Anchorage. Non-affiliated write-in candidate
 Fletcher Fuller Jr. of Anchorage. Non-affiliated write-in candidate
 Sidney Hill of Palmer. Non-affiliated write-in candidate

Results

References

External links
Division of Elections at Alaska Government
Alaska U.S. House at OurCampaigns.com
United States House of Representatives elections in Alaska, 2012 at Ballotpedia
Campaign contributions at OpenSecrets
Outside spending at the Sunlight Foundation

United States House of Representatives
Alaska
2012